Koh Kong Safari World was a zoo and  an animal theme park in Cambodia, located 500m from the border crossing to Thailand. Species included elephant,  dolphin, tiger, orangutan, and bird shows.

The zoo was transferred in 2018 to a new location in Phnom Penh, under the name Phnom Penh Safari World.

References

Parks in Cambodia
Tourist attractions in Cambodia
Koh Kong province
Zoos in Cambodia